The India cricket team toured Australia from November 2018 to January 2019 to play four Tests, three One Day Internationals (ODIs) and three Twenty20 International (T20I) matches. Initially, the Test match at the Adelaide Oval was planned to be a day/night fixture, but the Board of Control for Cricket in India (BCCI) declined the offer from Cricket Australia to play the match under lights. In April 2018, the Western Australian Cricket Association confirmed that the Perth Stadium would host its first ever Test match. During the second Test, it became the tenth venue in Australia to host a Test match.

India's regular wicket-keeper for limited overs matches, MS Dhoni, was not named in the side's squad for the T20I fixtures for this series and the ones against the West Indies. Instead, India's Test wicket-keeper, Rishabh Pant, was selected in Dhoni's place. The T20I series was drawn 1–1, after the second match finished in a no result. India won the Test series 2–1, after the fourth match of the series finished as a draw. India became the first Asian team to win a Test series in Australia.

In the ODI series that followed, Australia won the first match by 34 runs, recording their 1,000th win in international cricket. However, India went on to win the next two games, and consequently the series 2–1; in the process recording their first bilateral ODI series victory in Australia.

Squads

Mitchell Starc was added to Australia's T20I squad for the third match, replacing Billy Stanlake, who was injured. Prithvi Shaw was ruled out of India's Test squad due to injury and was replaced by Mayank Agarwal. Hardik Pandya was also added to India's squad for the last two Test matches. Marnus Labuschagne was added to Australia's squad for the fourth Test. Jasprit Bumrah was rested for the ODI series and was replaced by Mohammed Siraj in India's squad. Mitchell Marsh was ruled out of Australia's squad for the first ODI due to illness and was replaced by Ashton Turner.

On 11 January 2019, Hardik Pandya and KL Rahul were suspended by the BCCI following controversial comments they made on the Indian talk show Koffee with Karan earlier in the month. They were ruled out of the ODI series of this tour, and all of the fixtures of India's tour to New Zealand. Vijay Shankar was added to India's ODI squad as a replacement.

T20I series

1st T20I

2nd T20I

3rd T20I

Tour match

Four-day match: Cricket Australia XI vs India

Test series

Entering the series, India held the Border–Gavaskar Trophy after winning the 2017 series 2–1. Australia won the previous series at home 2–0 in 2014–15.

1st Test

2nd Test

3rd Test

4th Test

ODI series

1st ODI

2nd ODI

3rd ODI

References

External links
 Series home at ESPN Cricinfo

2018 in Australian cricket
2018 in Indian cricket
International cricket competitions in 2018–19
Indian cricket tours of Australia
2018–19 Australian cricket season